The Ford Sierra RS Cosworth is a high-performance version of the Ford Sierra that was built by Ford Europe from 1986 to 1992. It was the result of a Ford Motorsport project with the purpose of producing an outright winner for Group A racing in Europe.

Development 

The project was defined by Stuart Turner in the spring of 1983. He had recently been appointed head of Ford Motorsport in Europe, and he realised right away that Ford was no longer competitive in this area.

Turner got in touch with Walter Hayes, at the time the vice-president of public relations at Ford, to get support for the project. Hayes had earlier been the driving force behind the development of the Ford GT40 that won Le Mans in 1966, and the Cosworth DFV engine that brought Ford 154 victories and 12 world championships in Formula One during the 1960s and 1970s. Hayes found the project very appealing and promised his full support.

Turner then invited Ken Kohrs, vice-president of development, to visit Ford's longtime partner, the automotive engineering company Cosworth, where they were presented a project developed on Cosworth's own initiative, the YAA engine. This was a twin cam, 16-valve engine based on Ford's own T88 engine block, better known as the Pinto. This prototype proved an almost ideal basis for the engine Turner needed to power his Group A winner.

Therefore, an official request for a turbocharged version (designated Cosworth YBB) capable of 180 HP on the street and 300 HP in race trim, was placed. Cosworth answered positively, but they put up two conditions: the engine would produce not less than 150 kW (204 HP) in the street version, and Ford had to accept no fewer than 15,000 engines. Turner's project would only need about 5,000 engines, but Ford nevertheless accepted the conditions. The extra 10,000 engines would later become one of the reasons Ford also chose to develop a four-door, second generation, Sierra RS Cosworth.

To find a suitable gearbox proved more challenging. The Borg-Warner T5, also used in the Ford Mustang, was chosen, but the higher revving nature of the Sierra caused some problems. Eventually Borg-Warner had to set up a dedicated production line for the gearboxes to be used in the Sierra RS Cosworth.

Many of the suspension differences between the standard Sierra and the Cosworth attributed their development to what was learned from racing the turbocharged Jack Roush IMSA Merkur XR4Ti in America and Andy Rouse's successful campaign of the 1985 British Saloon Car Championship. Much of Ford's external documentation for customer race preparation indicated "developed for the XR4Ti" when describing parts that were Sierra Cosworth specific. Roush's suspension and aerodynamics engineering for the IMSA cars was excellent feedback for Ford. Some production parts from the XR4Ti made their way into the Cosworth such as the speedometer with integral boost gauge and the motorsport 909 chassis stiffening plates.

In April 1983, Turner's team decided on the Sierra as a basis for their project. The Sierra filled the requirements for rear wheel drive and decent aerodynamic drag. A racing version could also help to improve the poor, and somewhat undeserved, reputation that the Sierra had earned since its introduction in 1982.

Lothar Pinske, responsible for the car's bodywork, demanded carte blanche when it came to appearance in order to make the car stable at high speed. Experience had shown that the Sierra hatchback body generated significant aerodynamic lift even at relatively moderate speed.

After extensive wind tunnel testing and test runs at the Nardò circuit in Italy, a prototype was presented to the project management. This was based on an XR4i body with provisional body modifications in fibreglass and aluminium. The car's appearance raised little enthusiasm. The large rear wing caused particular reluctance. Pinske insisted, however, that the modifications were necessary to make the project successful. The rear wing was essential to retain ground contact at 300 km/h, the opening between the headlights was needed to feed air to the intercooler and the wheel arch extensions had to be there to house wheels 10” wide on the racing version. Eventually, the Ford designers agreed to try to make a production version based on the prototype.

In 1984, Walter Hayes paid visits to many European Ford dealers in order to survey the sales potential for the Sierra RS Cosworth. A requirement for participation in Group A was that 5,000 cars were built and sold. The feedback was not encouraging. The dealers estimated they could sell 1,500 cars.

Hayes did not give up, however, and continued his passionate internal marketing of the project. As prototypes started to emerge, dealers were invited to test-drive sessions, and this increased the enthusiasm for the new car. In addition, Ford took some radical measures to reduce the price on the car. As an example, the car was only offered in three exterior colours (black, white and moonstone blue) and one interior colour (grey). There were also just two equipment options: with or without central locking and electric window lifts.  European models differed from UK models in their specification with a basic radio cassette and no amplifier being fitted rather than the Ford Sound 2000 head unit and amplifier.

Production 
The Ford Sierra RS Cosworth was first presented to the public at the Geneva Motor Show in March 1985, with plans to release it for sale in September and closing production of the 5,000 cars in the summer of 1986.

In practice, it was launched in July 1986, and 5545 were manufactured in total, of which 500 were sent to Tickford for conversion to the Sierra three-door RS500 Cosworth. The vehicles were manufactured at Ford's Genk factory in Belgium in both Left and Right hand drive, with the Pre Production Prove out Process cars produced in February 1986 and the main production of the vehicle commencing summer 1986, the final cars off the production line were in December 1986. 3 colours were produced, Black, White and Moonstone Blue, with White and Moonstone Blue both seeing around 2/5th of the total number of Right Hand Drive models produced with Black cars around 1/5th.  The following number of vehicles were registered in the UK:

As published in the 1986 RS catalog:
 Max speed: 149 mph
 0-60 mph:  6.5 sec
 Fuel consumption at 56 mph:  38.2 mpg
 Fuel consumption at 75 mph:  30.1 mpg
 Drag coefficient:  0.345
 Rear spoiler: 20kgf at 150 mph
 Front brakes:  Disc 28.3 cm diameter
 Rear brakes:  Disc 27.3 cm diameter
 Differential:  Viscous coupled limited slip
 Tyre size:  205/50 VRx15
 Wheels:  15"x7" alloys

Sierra RS500 Cosworth 

Mike Moreton was head of the team that planned to develop an evolution edition aimed at making the car unbeatable on the race tracks. In March 1987, Aston Martin Tickford was signed for the job of converting the 500 cars.

The Cosworth RS500 was announced in July 1987, and was homologated in August 1987.

The main difference to the Sierra three-door Cosworth was Cosworth's uprated competition engine. Its new features were:

 The Inline-four engine had a thicker walled cylinder block to cope with the rigours of the track
 A larger Garrett AiResearch T04 turbocharger
 A larger air-air intercooler
 A second set of four Weber IW025 "yellow" fuel injectors and a second fuel rail (not activated in the roadgoing version)
 An uprated fuel pump 
 A reworked induction system to allow higher power outputs to be realised
 An uprated oil and cooling system 
 The rear semi-trailing arm beam had extended but unused mounting points

The RS500 also had minor external cosmetic differences to its parent the Sierra three-door Cosworth:

 The rear tailgate had a lower spoiler in addition to the upper "whale tail"
 Discreet RS500 badges on the rear tailgate and front wings
 A redesigned front bumper and spoiler to aid cooling and air flow, including the removal of the fog lamps and their replacement with intake grilles to supplement brake cooling
 

Exactly 500 RS500s were produced using the 500 Sierra RS Cosworth vehicles that were produced at Genk in December 1986, all of them RHD for sale in the UK only - the biggest market for this kind of Ford car.  It was originally intended that all 500 would be black, however 56 white and 52 moonstone blue cars were also produced.

Some European tuners, missing a LHD RS500 version, have set up some elaborate versions of the Sierra RS Cosworth for private customers, replicating some of the RS500's specs. A tuning business with experience of this model is Wolf Racing, which was racing with the Sierra from 1986 to 1989 in the German touring car championship Deutsche Tourenwagen Meisterschaft.

The official tuning kit for the engine included:
 Racing pistons
 Green injectors
 Bigger petrol pump
 Racing wastegate
 Electronic control chip 
 Steel exhaust

Concerning the aesthetics:
 Lowered sport suspensions
 16" wheels with gold alloys (BTCC racing version)
 RS500 original aero kit
 RS500 decals
 Tinting films on rear windows
 RS500 instrumentation with 300 km/h full-scale
 Additional integrated instrumentation in the central console
 Racing gear knob
 Sport pedals

The declared power was 260 PS, although some owners claim at least 40 PS more.

Motorsport achievements

Touring car racing
In August 1987, the Sierra RS500 Cosworth was homologated with a larger turbo, new rear deck spoiler and an extra 100 horsepower. Fords took pole position in all the remaining six 1987 World Touring Car Championship events, and was first over the finish line in four of them. The works Eggenberger Motorsport team won the entrants' World Championship, although disqualification of the team's cars from the 1987 Bathurst 1000 in Australia for wheel arch panel irregularities deprived Klaus Ludwig and Klaus Niedzwiedz of the drivers' title. Eggenberger won the 1989 Spa 24 Hours. Robb Gravett won the 1990 British Touring Car Championship in a RS500.
Essentially the Evolution RS500 was the creation of Eggenberger who insisted the editions he proposed for the Evolution would make the Sierra a winner and dominate touring car racing around the world.

The RS500 was successful in the 1988 DTM with Klaus Ludwig in the Ford Team Grab winning the drivers championship and Wolf Racing winning the Team Championship, Both Grab and Wolf were Ford Works Teams and beat Mercedes-AMG Boss along with BMW M Sport for the honours.

The RS500 was successful in Australian touring car racing with Dick Johnson Racing dominating the 1988 and 1989 Australian Touring Car Championships, with Dick Johnson and John Bowe finishing one-two in both years. Early in 1988, the Johnson team also took the step of homologating a modified Ford nine-inch axle for the Sierra, eliminating the car's drivetrain weakness and allowing the cars to be driven harder with less fear of failure. This was also seen as essential in Australia which used standing starts compared to the rolling starts used in Europe.

Glenn Seton won the 1990 Australian Endurance Championship driving a Sierra RS500.

The RS500 won the Bathurst 1000 twice; in 1988 with Tony Longhurst and Tomas Mezera and in 1989 with Johnson and Bowe. It also won the 1988 Sandown 500 with Allan Moffat and Gregg Hansford and the 1990 Sandown 500 with Glenn Seton and George Fury. Robbie Francevic won the New Zealand Touring Car Championship in 1989 and 1990 for Mark Petch Motorsport.

Major wins
Major series and race wins by the Ford Sierra RS500 include:

Series wins
 World Touring Car Championship - 1987 (entrants' title)
 Australian Touring Car Championship - 1988, 1989
 Deutsche Tourenwagen Meisterschaft - 1988
 Japanese Touring Car Championship - 1988, 1989
 AMSCAR series - 1988, 1989, 1990
 Nissan Mobil 500 Series - 1989, 1990
 New Zealand Touring Car Championship - 1989, 1990, 1992
 British Touring Car Championship - 1990
 Australian Endurance Championship - 1990

Race wins
 Wellington 500 - 1987
 Fuji InterTEC 500 - 1987, 1988, 1989
 RAC Tourist Trophy - 1988
 Sandown 500 - 1988, 1990
 Bathurst 1000 - 1988, 1989
 Pukekohe 500 - 1988, 1989, 1990
 Spa 24 Hours - 1989
 Guia Race of Macau - 1989

Rallying

The Sierra Cosworth was also pressed into service as a rally car, and saw some success.  After the abolition of the Group B formula in the World Rally Championship at the end of 1986, manufacturers had to turn to Group A cars and Ford, like most others, found itself without a fully suitable car.  The Cosworth was very powerful but, with only rear-wheel-drive, lost out to the four-wheel-drive Lancias and Mazdas on loose-surface events, while the four-wheel-drive XR4x4 had an excellent chassis but an elderly engine producing only around 200 bhp, at least 100 less than the Lancia.  For the 1987 season the team ran both, using the XR4x4 on loose surfaces and the Cosworth on tarmac, but the XR4x4's power disadvantage was too great and from 1988 the team concentrated on the Cosworth alone, and continued to use it until the arrival of the Sierra RS Cosworth 4x4 in 1990.

The rear-drive car never won a loose-surface World Rally Championship event, but in the hands of drivers such as Stig Blomqvist, Carlos Sainz and Ari Vatanen it frequently finished in the top five, except when conditions were particularly slippery.  On tarmac it was a much more serious competitor, and a young Didier Auriol won the 1988 Corsica Rally outright, the only time that season that Lancia were beaten in a straight fight.  However, as Lancia developed the Delta Integrale further and new cars such as the Toyota Celica GT-Four ST165 appeared, the Cosworth became steadily less competitive.

Thanks to strong support and readily available parts from Ford Motorsport, the Cosworth was a popular car with private teams.  Moreover, below world championship level, four-wheel-drive opposition was limited at the time, and the Cosworth was as fast as any of its two-wheel-drive rivals.  It lacked the fine handling of the BMW M3, for example, but on the other hand it was much more powerful.  It was also very reliable.  Consequently, it became a very popular car at the national championship level, and during the late 1980s Sierra drivers won many national series.  For example, Jimmy McRae took the British Rally Championship in a Sierra in 1987 and 1988, whilst Carlos Sainz won the Spanish Rally Championship, and Didier Auriol won the French Rally Championship in those same years.  The Cosworth was popular with spectators because it was visually dramatic, with its flame-spitting exhaust and tail-sliding, rear-drive handling; and it was popular with amateur drivers because it was competitive, robust and relatively cheap. To this day it is a fairly common sight at lower-level events.

WRC victories

{|class="wikitable" style="font-size: 95%; "
! No.
! Event
! Season
! Driver
! Co-driver
! Car
|-
| 1
|  32ème Tour de Corse
| 1988
|  Didier Auriol
|  Bernard Occelli
| Ford Sierra RS Cosworth
|-
|}

Two wheel drive Sierra Sapphire RS Cosworth 

The second generation four-door Sierra Sapphire Cosworth was assembled in Genk, Belgium, with the UK-built Ford-Cosworth YBB engine. Cylinder heads on this car were early spec two wheel drive heads and also the "later" two wheel drive head which had some improvements which made their way to the 4X4 head. Suspension was essentially the same with some minor changes in geometry to suit a less aggressive driving style and favour ride over handling. Spindles, wheel offset and other changes were responsible for this effect. Approximately 13,140 examples were produced during 1988-1989 and were the most numerous and lightest of all Sierra Cosworth models. Specifically the left hand drive models (LHD) which saved weight with a lesser trim level such as roll up rear windows, no air conditioning etc.

In the UK, the RHD 1988-1989 Sierra Sapphire RS Cosworths are badged with small "Sapphire" badges on the rear door window trims. All 1988-1989 LHD models are badged and registered as  Sierra RS Cosworths with no Sapphire nomenclature at all. "Sapphire" being viewed as a Ghia trim level that saw power rear windows, air conditioning and other minor options.

The Sapphire Cosworth, being based on a different shell to the original three-door Cosworth, along with its more discreet rear wing, recorded a drag co-efficient of 0.33, thus allowing it to register slightly better performance figures (top speed of 150 mph and 0-60 of 6.1 seconds) compared to the original Cosworth.

Sierra RS Cosworth 4x4 

In January 1990 the third generation Sierra RS Cosworth was launched, this time with four wheel drive. As early as 1987, Mike Moreton and Ford Motorsport had been talking about a four-wheel drive Sierra RS Cosworth that could make Ford competitive in the World Rally Championship. The Ferguson MT75 gearbox that was considered an essential part of the project wasn't available until late 1989 however.

Ford Motorsport's desire for a 3-door "Motorsport Special" equivalent to the original Sierra RS Cosworth was not embraced. The more discreet 4-door version was considered to have a better market potential. It was therefore decided that the new car should be a natural development of the second generation, to be launched in conjunction with the face lift scheduled for the entire Sierra line in 1990.

The waiting time gave Ford Motorsport a good opportunity to conduct extensive testing and demand improvements. One example was the return of the bonnet louvers. According to Ford's own publicity material, 80% of the engine parts were also modified. The improved engine was designated YBG for cars with a catalytic converter and YBJ for cars without. The former had the red valve cover replaced by a green one, to emphasize the environmental friendliness. Four wheel drive and an increasing amount of equipment had raised the weight by 100 kg, and the power was therefore increased to just about compensate for this.

The Sierra RS Cosworth 4x4 received, if possible, an even more flattering response than its predecessors and production continued until the end of 1992, when the Sierra was replaced by the Mondeo. The replacement for the Sierra RS Cosworth was not a Mondeo however, but the Escort RS Cosworth. Based on the Sierra Cosworth platform, the Escort went on sale in May 1992, more than a year after the first pre-production examples were shown to the public, and was homologated for Group A rally in December, just as the Sierra RS Cosworth was retired. It continued in production until 1996.

The 4x4 Cosworth made a few appearances as a works rally car in 1990, and then tackled a full World Championship programme for 1991 and 1992.  It was not a great success and never won a World Championship event, although in the hands of drivers such as Francois Delecour and Massimo Biasion it did take several second and third places.  Initially it was unreliable, the gearbox being an especially weak point, and although by 1992 the reliability problems had been solved the Cosworth was never quite as effective in most conditions as some of its rivals.  It was a relatively large car, slightly heavy, and less sophisticated than the latter generations of the Lancia Delta and Toyota Celica in terms of transmission systems and electronics.  Biasion was reputedly strongly critical of the car on his first events for the team in 1992, but earned its best World Championship finish on that year's Rally of Portugal, where he finished second.  He also brought its World Championship career to a close with fifth place on that Lombard RAC Rally.  By then technical development of the Sierra had ceased, and most of the team's effort was directed towards the upcoming Escort Cosworth, which promised to be a much more competitive prospect.

Like the rear-drive car, the Cosworth 4x4 was popular at lower levels of rallying and a consistent winner at national championship level, and it remains a popular car among amateur rally drivers.

See also
 Sierra XR4i

 For USA; Merkur_XR4Ti

References

Rally cars
Touring cars
Sierra RS Cosworth
Cars introduced in 1986
1990s cars
Cars discontinued in 1992